Becoming Cousteau is a 2021 American documentary film directed and produced by Liz Garbus. It follows the life and career of Jacques Cousteau.

It premiered at the Telluride Film Festival on September 2, 2021, and was released on October 22, 2021, by Picturehouse.

Synopsis
The film follows the life and career of Jacques Cousteau, who tried to warn the world for decades about climate change.

Production
In 2015, National Geographic Documentary Films approached Liz Garbus about directing a documentary film revolving around Jacques Cousteau, and she agreed. Over the course of five years, Garbus worked with The Cousteau Society to get access to unseen footage.

In May 2019, it was announced Garbus would direct a documentary film revolving around Cousteau, with Cousteau Society Archives producing and with National Geographic Documentary Films set to produce.

Release
It had its world premiere at the 48th Telluride Film Festival on September 2, 2021. It had its international premiere at the Toronto International Film Festival on September 10, 2021. It was released on October 22, 2021, by Picturehouse.

Reception

Critical reception
Becoming Costeau  holds a 98% approval rating on review aggregator website Rotten Tomatoes, based on 54 reviews, with a weighted average of 7.40/10. On Metacritic, the film holds a rating of 74 out of 100, based on 16 critics, indicating "generally favorable reviews".

Accolades

References

External links
 
 
 

2021 films
2021 documentary films
American documentary films
National Geographic Society films
Films directed by Liz Garbus
2020s American films
Jacques Cousteau